Grand Lake High School is a public primary and secondary school in Grand Lake, Louisiana, an unincorporated town in Cameron Parish, Louisiana, United States. The school, a part of the Cameron Parish School Board, has grades Pre-Kindergarten through 12.

History
In September 2005 Hurricane Rita swept through Cameron Parish, damaging Cameron Elementary, South Cameron Elementary, and South Cameron High. The South Cameron students shared Grand Lake High School's campus with Grand Lake for almost an entire year. the South Cameron elementary and high school students moved into the South Cameron High School campus by fall 2006.

School uniforms
Navy and khaki uniform bottoms and white or navy tops.

Athletics
Grand Lake High athletics competes in the LHSAA.

References

External links
 
Archive of Grand Lake High School website
Grand Lake High School profile

Public K-12 schools in Louisiana
Schools in Cameron Parish, Louisiana